Limapontia capitata  is a species of sacoglossan sea slug, a shell-less marine opisthobranch gastropod mollusk in the family Limapontiidae.

Limapontia capitata ocuurs on the coasts of the northeastern Atlantic Ocean, including the Baltic Sea, and the Mediterranean Sea.

The type locality is the Baltic Sea.

Taxonomy 
According to Pruvot-Fol (1954) and Abbott (1974) this species should be named as Limopontia nigra (Müller, 1773). Other authors however prefer the name Limopontia capitata (Müller, 1774) and then Limopontia nigra Johnston, 1836 should be regarded a synonym of Limopontia capitata.

In contrast to Pruvot-Fol (1954), but according to Thompson (1976), Gascoigne (1978), McKay & Smith (1979) and Cattaneo & Barletta (1984) Limopontia capitata and Limopontia depressa are considered as two separate species.

References
This article incorporates CC-BY-SA-3.0 text from the reference 

Limapontiidae
Molluscs of the Atlantic Ocean
Fauna of the Baltic Sea
Molluscs of the Mediterranean Sea
Taxa named by Otto Friedrich Müller
Gastropods described in 1774